Mariano Riva Palacio (1803 - 1880) was a Mexican prominent politician and lawyer during most of the 19th century.

He was born in Mexico City to Esteban de la Riva Palacio and Doña María Dolores Díaz and married Dolores Guerrero, daughter of Gen. Vicente Guerrero, one of the most prominent leaders of the Mexican Independence War. With Maria he had 6 children, including the politician and writer Vicente Riva Palacio and daughter Maria Rosa Riva Palacio, who would go on to marry Mexican General and Politician, Ignacio Zaragoza. Mariano served as a City Councilor for Mexico City (1829), federal congressman (1833), Minister of Justice (1851), Minister of Finance (June - August 1848)  and was elected thrice Governor of the State of Mexico (1849, 1857, 1871).

He was also the lawyer appointed to defend the deposed Emperor Maximilian.

External links
University of Texas

References

Mexican Secretaries of Finance
Governors of the State of Mexico
Members of the Chamber of Deputies (Mexico)
Presidents of the Chamber of Deputies (Mexico)
1803 births
1880 deaths
19th-century Mexican lawyers